An Urban Allegory is a 1992 steel sculpture by Neil Hadlock, installed in Salt Lake City, Utah, United States. The sculpture measures approximately 8 x 4 x 20 feet and rests on a concrete base which measures approximately 4 x 4 x 4 feet. It was dedicated in June 1992. The artwork was surveyed by the Smithsonian Institution's "Save Outdoor Sculpture!" program in 1993.

References

1992 sculptures
Outdoor sculptures in Salt Lake City
Steel sculptures in the United States